Incest refers to sexual relations between relatives.

Incest may also refer to:

 Incest (film), a 1929 German film directed by James Bauer
 Incest (law), a crime in various jurisdictions
 Incest (novel), a 1999 novel by Christine Angot
 Incest: From a Journal of Love, a 1992 autobiography by Anaïs Nin

See also
 
 
 Inbreeding
 Incest pornography